Avengers Assemble was an ongoing comic book series featuring the Marvel Comics superhero team the Avengers. Its initial release coincided with the release of the 2012 film The Avengers.

The series was originally featured as an Avengers book featuring the cast from the 2012 film, designed to attract fans of Marvel's cinematic universe to the comics. After issue #8, it switched focus to showing different Avengers between missions. Beginning with #14 A.U., it has become the Avengers book used for crossovers.

The series ended in March 2014.

Publication history
Brian Michael Bendis wrote the first eight issues after which Kelly Sue DeConnick and Stefano Caselli took over as part of Marvel NOW!.

Team roster
Avengers Assemble began its run featuring the six members from the 2012 film. From issue #9 and on, it does not have an official roster, instead focusing on various Avengers.

Collected editions

References

External links
Marvel page: AA2004, AAH2010, AA2012, AAA2013

Avengers (comics) titles